The Mauretania is a pub in the English city of Bristol, built in 1870 by Henry Masters, with a rear extension being added in 1938 by WH Watkins. It has been designated by English Heritage as a grade II listed building.

Some of the furnishings from the RMS Mauretania were installed in a bar/restaurant complex at the bottom of Park Street, initially called "Mauretania", now "Java".  The lounge bar was the library with mahogany panelling: above the first-class Grand Saloon with French-style gilding overlooks Frog Lane.  The neon sign on the south wall still advertises the "Mauretania": installed in 1938 this was the first moving neon sign in Bristol.

References 

Culture in Bristol
Music venues in Bristol
Commercial buildings completed in 1870
Grade II listed pubs in Bristol
Pubs in Gloucestershire